Pierre Guénin (19 February 1927 – 1 March 2017) was a French journalist and gay rights activist. He was an early publisher of LGBT magazines in the late 1960s and the 1970s, and the founder of the LGBT film awards in France. He was the founder of the eponymous Prix Pierre Guénin for LGBT activists.

Early life
Pierre Guénin was born in Étampes, France on 19 February 1927.

Career
Guénin was a journalist for Cinémonde, a magazine about cinema.

Guénin founded Editions S.A.N., a publisher of LGBT magazines, in 1967. He was the founding editor of Eden and Olympe, whose circulations were forbidden under President Valéry Giscard d'Estaing in 1978. He subsequently founded In and Jean-Paul.

Guénin founded the Prix Off, the first awards for LGBT films in France, in 1978. In 2009, he founded the Prix Pierre Guénin, an annual prize for LGBT activists.

Guénin was the author of several books.

Death
Guénin died on 1 March 2017 in Paris at the age of 90.

Works

References

1927 births
2017 deaths
People from Étampes
20th-century French journalists
French non-fiction writers
20th-century French novelists
20th-century French dramatists and playwrights
French LGBT rights activists
French gay writers
Chevaliers of the Ordre des Arts et des Lettres